Sarbeswar Bujarbarua is an Indian physicist. Educated at Gujrat University and Gauhati University, he founded the Centre of Plasma Physics as part of the Institute for Plasma Research and served as its director for 30 years.

References

1948 births
Living people
Indian physicists
Plasma physicists
Space scientists
Gujarat University alumni